Puttalam railway station is a railway station in the Puttalam District, North Western Province, Sri Lanka. The station is served by Sri Lanka Railways, which is the state-run railway operator.

The station was the original terminus of what was originally known as the North West line. It was officially opened on 12 May 1926.

In 1943 the track from Bangadeniya to Puttalam was removed, as the rails were required on other strategically important routes due to shortages caused by World War II. It was re-laid in 1946 with a number of new stations added to the line.

Continuity

See also 
List of railway stations in Sri Lanka
List of railway stations in Sri Lanka by line
Sri Lanka Railways

References 

Railway stations in Puttalam District
Railway stations on the Puttalam Line